Moara is a commune located in Suceava County, Bukovina, northeastern Romania. It is composed of seven villages, namely: Frumoasa, Groapa Vlădichii, Liteni, Moara Carp, Moara Nica (the commune centre), Vornicenii Mari, and Vornicenii Mici.

From 1785 to 1941, Vornicenii Mari village was inhabited by the Székelys of Bukovina.

Administration and local politics

Communal council 

The commune's current local council has the following political composition, according to the results of the 2020 Romanian local elections:

Natives 

 Ilie Ivanciuc, former rugby union player

References 

Polish communities in Romania
Communes in Suceava County
Localities in Southern Bukovina